No Means No (also known as Nie Means Nie) is an upcoming Indo-Polish romantic thriller film, which was shot simultaneously in three languages: English, Hindi and Polish. Produced by G7 Films Poland and directed by Vikash Verma, it stars Dhruv Verma, Gulshan Grover, Sharad Kapoor and Anna Guzik.<ref name=":2">{{Cite news|last=|first=|date=|title=The first Indo-Polish film - teenage love story "No Means No to boost tourism, reinforce culture connection|work=Asian News International|url=https://www.aninews.in/news/business/business/the-first-indo-polish-film-teenage-love-story-no-means-no-to-boost-tourism-reinforce-culture-connection20210203152533|access-date=}}</ref> The film follows  an Indian ski champion (Dhruv Verma), who participates in a ski championship in Poland. There he falls in love with a Polish girl. Initially scheduled to be released on 22 March 2021, but postponed due to the COVID-19 pandemic in India. Later it was scheduled for release on 5 November 2021, but release was again pushed back to 17 June 2022. Film Critic Murtuza Ali Khan tweeted the new release date as 16 December 2022. Following the outbreak of war in Ukraine and two missiles landing in Poland, the release date was postponed to 19 May 2023.

 Cast 

 Dhruv Verma as Raj
 Natalia Bak as Kasia
 Sylvia Czech as Katarzyna
 Gulshan Grover as Vijay Grover
 Anna Guzik as Kinga Gora
 Kat Kirstein as Anushka
 Anna Ador as Saanjh
 Neetu Chandra as Neetu
 Sharad Kapoor as Shekhar Oberoi
 Nazia Hussain as Leena D'Souza
 Deepraj Rana as Stallone
 Pawel Czech as Police Officer
 Milind Joshi as Judge
 Abhishek Bhatnagar as Antagonist
 Arman Kohli as Shekhar Oberoi

 Music 
The background music of the film is provided by Hariharan and his son Akshay Hariharan. Karan Hariharan and Shreya Ghoshal  are among the singers in the movie.  Rishav Nagh has also made many of the songs in the film.

 Filming "No Means No" is  produced by G7 Films Poland and directed by Vikash Verma as first Indo-polish film. Michal Szewczuk  is the Cinematographer.No Means No'' is 80% filmed in Poland and 20% in India. It has been a goal for India and Poland to strengthen bilateral relations through movie industry and they have been working on it for some time now.

References

External links 
 
 No Means No on Bollywood Hungama
 Listing on The Tribute, Canada
  No Means No on Rotten Tomatoes

2022 films
2020s Hindi-language films
2020s Polish-language films
Indian multilingual films
Polish multilingual films
Upcoming films
Upcoming Indian films
Upcoming Hindi-language films
Films shot in Poland
Indian romantic thriller films
Polish romantic drama films
2022 multilingual films